Bernert is the surname of:

 Brandi Bernert, American sprinter and bronze medalist at the 2015 World Masters Athletics Championships
 Dieter Bernert, drummer for German metal band Brainstorm
 Eleanor H. Bernert (born 1920), American sociologist
 Franz Bernert (1876–1890), Apostolic Vicar of Saxony
 Fritz Otto Bernert (1893–1918), German World War I fighter ace
 Joe Bernert, American CEO of Havis, Inc.
 Kristin Bernert, American manager of New York Liberty women's basketball team for 2015–2016
 Martyna Bernert, Polish soccer player for 1. FC Katowice
 Michael James Bernert, 2005 Intel ISEF finalist and namesake of asteroid 21505 Bernert
 Suzanne Bernert (born 1982), German-born actress in Indian films

See also 
 21505 Bernert, a main-belt asteroid